Clark Lake is a lake located in Gogebic County in the U.S. state of Michigan. Clark Lake is one of about two dozen clear, clean lakes located in the Sylvania Wilderness of Ottawa National Forest a few miles (6 to 8 km) to the west of the town of Watersmeet. The shoreline is undeveloped except for a picnic area and boat launch at the northern end. The lake possesses several islands and numerous bays and coves. Large boulders strewn about the shoreline and lake bed add to the scenic beauty of this lake. It is not uncommon to see nesting loons and eagles around the lake's islands, and black bear and wolves inhabit the old-growth forest around the lake.

Like all lakes in Sylvania, Clark Lake has numerous special regulations designed to protect and ensure its wilderness quality for future generations.  No motorized watercraft are allowed, and a catch and release policy is in place for bass species.

See also
List of lakes in Michigan

References

External links

 

Lakes of Michigan
Lakes of Gogebic County, Michigan
Ottawa National Forest